Anse-à-Pitres, or Anse-à-Pitre is a commune in the Belle-Anse Arrondissement, in the Sud-Est department of Haiti. Its border crossing to Pedernales is one of the four chief land crossings to the Dominican Republic.

References

Populated places in Sud-Est (department)
Dominican Republic–Haiti border crossings
Communes of Haiti